GMA Kapuso Foundation Inc. (formerly Bisig Bayan Foundation and GMA Foundation) is a socio-civic organization organized by GMA Network Inc. to facilitate social programs and outreach to the public.

Since it was founded in 1991, GMA Kapuso Foundation has been touching the lives of communities everywhere. Its projects help uplift the life of countless beneficiaries.

Implemented singly or in partnership with other agencies, the foundation's thrusts are focused on helping and supporting impoverished families, needy children, calamity victims, prisoners and ex-prisoners, aspiring singers and songwriters, including dependents of GMA employees.

Projects

Health 
 Bisig Bayan Medical Assistance (BB)
 Kalusugan Karavan (KK)

Education 
 Kapuso School Development (KSD) Project
 Unang Hakbang sa Kinabukasan (UHSK)

Disaster Relief 
 Operation Bayanihan (OpsBay)

Values Formation 
 Kapuso ng Kalikasan (KNK) Project
 Sagip Dugtong Buhay
 Give-A-Gift: Alay sa Batang Pinoy

Awards

53rd Anvil Awards 

 Silver Anvil Award (Public Relations Tools – Publications category): 
‘20 Years of Serbisyong Totoo: The GMA Kapuso Foundation, Inc. 2016 Annual Report’
 Silver Anvil Award (Public Relations Tools: Multimedia/Digital Online Video/Online News): 
‘Kapuso Para sa Kawal Project,’ Layong Matulungan ang mga Sundalong Lumalaban sa Marawi
 Silver Anvil Award (Public Relations Tools: Multimedia/Digital Online Video/Online News):
Rebuild Marawi MTV

52nd Anvil Awards 

 Silver Anvil Award (Public Relations Tools – Publications category):
Empowering the Youth: The GMA Kapuso Foundation, Inc. 2015 Annual Report

34th Agora Awards

 Outstanding Achievement In Advocacy Marketing
GMA Kapuso Foundation, Inc.

Philippine Quill Awards 

 Merit Award
The Worst of Times. The Best of Times: The GMA Kapuso Foundation, Inc. 2009 Annual Report

45th Anvil Awards 
 Anvil Award of Excellence Ryu Watanabe
GMA Kapuso Foundation, Inc. Annual Report

References 

GMA Network (company)
Foundations based in the Philippines
Organizations established in 1991
1991 establishments in the Philippines